Walter Freitag (14 August 1889 – 7 June 1958) was a German politician of the Social Democratic Party (SPD) and member of the German Bundestag.

Life 
Freitag was an honorary district administrator of the Ennepe-Ruhr district from 1946 to 1949 and a member of the state parliament of North Rhine-Westphalia from 1946 to 1950. From 1949 to 1953 he was a member of the German Bundestag. He was directly elected in the Ennepe-Ruhr-Kreis II Bundestag election district.

Literature

References

1889 births
1958 deaths
Members of the Bundestag for North Rhine-Westphalia
Members of the Bundestag 1949–1953
Members of the Bundestag for the Social Democratic Party of Germany
Members of the Landtag of North Rhine-Westphalia